Richard Herring's Leicester Square Theatre Podcast (or RHLSTP) and Richard Herring's Edinburgh Fringe Podcast are two related comedy podcasts, created and hosted by British comedian Richard Herring. Hosted on The British Comedy Guide, the podcasts are interviews with notable guests, usually fellow comedians. The original Edinburgh Fringe podcast ran from 2011 to 2013, and took place most days for the duration of the Fringe, focusing on interviews with performers at the festival. They also contain short stand-up segments from Fringe performers. The Leicester Square Theatre Podcast, recorded at Leicester Square in London, began in 2012 and follows a similar format, with higher profile guests. It runs for a shorter series than the Edinburgh Fringe version, with weekly recordings.

Both podcasts are performed in front of a paying audience, but released for free download and streaming. Series One and Two of the Leicester Square Theatre Podcast were released solely in audio format, with the exception of Stewart Lee's episode, which was initially released as a DVD Extra for Fist of Fun, Series Two. From Series Three onwards all episodes of the show were released in both audio and video format – initially as a paid download, then free on YouTube. Series Seven was the first to be financed by a Kickstarter campaign in order to cover the costs of production. Since Series Seventeen, Richard Herring's Leicester Square Theatre Podcast has been recorded on tour at different venues and, as such, has been referred to only by the acronym title of RHLSTP. After only one episode of Series Nineteen was recorded, the remainder of the series was postponed due to the COVID-19 pandemic. Herring has continued to conduct interviews and provide new content via Twitch during the lockdown.
In March 2022 he started releasing the RHLSTP Book Club podcast on Fridays, recorded remotely, where he chatted with authors about one of their books

Episode guide

Edinburgh Fringe Podcast

Leicester Square Theatre Podcast

RHLSTP Book Club

Reception
The Leicester Square Theatre Podcast has won the Internet Award at the 2012, 2013, 2014 and 2018 Chortle Awards, and was the only non-BBC programme to be nominated for the comedy award at the 2013 Sony Radio Awards. The show won a bronze award in the category, becoming the first internet-only award winner in this section. Radiohead's Jonny Greenwood has also heralded the Leicester Square Theatre Podcast citing it as one of his cultural highlights in The Guardian.

In Herring's interview with Stephen Fry, Fry revealed that he had attempted to commit suicide. The story was reported across various newspapers and international news networks including the BBC and Sky News. His interview with Russell Brand also came to some press attention several months after its release, the press focusing on Brand discussing pleasuring a man in a public toilet for his 2002 TV show RE:Brand.

Theme

"Try Again" by Pest was used as the theme from the first episode until the end of series 20.  From series 21 onwards this was replaced by a theme performed and specifically composed for the show by Scant Regard, the solo project of musician Will Crewdson.

References

External links

RHLSTP! (RHLSTP!) reference resource

Comedy and humor podcasts
Interview podcasts
Audio podcasts
2011 podcast debuts
2012 podcast debuts
British podcasts